Julien Farel (born September 30, 1968) is a French celebrity hairstylist, "haircare innovator" and entrepreneur in the luxury, beauty, and wellness arena. He is the Chairman of the Julien Farel Group and founder of Julien Farel Anti-Aging Haircare.

Early life 

Julien Farel was born and raised in Montfaucon-en-Velay, Auvergne, France, a small commune southeast of Lyon. He has two brothers – one older and one younger. His family worked in the textile industry selling fabrics and house linens throughout the country. 
In 1982, when Farel’s parents divorced, he was too young to join the family business, so he lived with his mother and attended a professional soccer school near his home. Farel soon refused to go to soccer training and instead pursued his love for competitive skiing.

Career 

In 1987, Farel joined Jacques Dessange in Lyon, France, where he spent five years on his team before relocating to New York City in 1992 to run the Jacques Dessange New York Training School on Park Avenue. Upon arrival in the United States, Farel spoke no English, knew no one and had only $2,000 to his name. He moved from apartment to apartment, sleeping on floors and couches in Brooklyn, while also working extremely long hours. After just a few months, he was able to save enough money to rent and furnish his own apartment in Manhattan. 

In 1994, Farel was recruited to run all training and education for stylist Frédéric Fekkai in both New York City and Los Angeles. He started at Fekkai's salon in Bergdorf Goodman and moved to Chanel in 1996 as a result of Chanel’s acquisition of Fekkai.  Farel was at Fekkai until 2001 when he launched the Julien Farel Group and opened an interim salon at New York City's Pierre Hotel. Shortly after, he opened the Julien Farel Salon at 605 Madison Avenue.

The success of the flagship salon led to the opening of Julien Farel Salon at the Setai on Fifth Avenue, which features JF Express, the world’s first anti-aging blow dry bar as well as salons in Miami, Florida, and at the Capella Pedregal Resort in Cabo San Lucas, Mexico. Julien Farel Group also introduced JF Gymnastique, a private fitness studio, on the fourth floor of 605 Madison Avenue to offer a "holistic wellness experience" at the facility. In April 2014, Farel relocated the Madison Avenue flagship salon to the Loews Regency Hotel on Park Avenue.

US Open Tennis Tournament and the Julien Farel Pop Up Salon and Spa 

In 2007, Julien and his team became the exclusive hairstylists to the tennis players at the US Open. The courtside experience is tailored to players, coaches, United States Tennis Association executives and celebrity tennis fans so that they are "camera ready" for the tennis matches. Julien Farel Salon has styled some of tennis’ biggest stars in previous years including Novak Djokovic, Rafael Nadal, Ana Ivanovic and Victoria Azarenka.

Julien Farel Haircare 

After opening his flagship salon in 2001, Farel spent several years searching for a specific, innovative hair care technology to launch a namesake product line. In 2011, Julien Farel Haircare launched.

The anti-aging haircare was formulated in collaboration with a renowned Italian scientist who has been utilizing hyaluronic acid and other anti-aging ingredients for over 40 years.  The hair care product line is divided into categories to suit individual needs – Vitamin: For Color Treated Hair; Hydrate: For Normal Hair; De-Frizz: For Curly & Frizzy Hair . Styling products are available in Flexible and Sculpting for all hair types. The personal care category includes Energize: Hand and Body Wash.

Clientele 

Julien Farel has worked for an extensive list of celebrity clients including but not limited to Brooke Shields, Inès de La Fressange, Ivanka Trump, Lauren Bush Lauren, Rachel Weisz, Kate Moss, Audrey Tautou, Olivia Palermo, Julia Louis-Dreyfus, Catherine Deneuve, Michael J. Fox, Richard Gere, Rod Stewart, Cynthia Nixon, Kate Beckinsale, America Ferrera, Adrien Brody, Debra Messing, Lea Michele, Giuliana Rancic.

Editorial 

The Julien Farel Salon has been featured in the New York Times, Wall Street Journal, Allure, Vogue, Vanity Fair, Gotham, Hamptons, Town & Country, W and Departures. Farel works regularly on fashion shoots with Ralph Lauren, Oscar de la Renta, Fendi, Louis Vuitton and other luxury brands.

Personal life 

Farel married Suelyn Bogdanoff in October 2004 at Villa Ephrussi de Rothschild in Saint Jean Cap Ferrat, France. In 2007, Suelyn Farel joined Julien Farel Group as the CEO specializing in brand management and business development for the company. The couple has two daughters.

Notes

References 
Mansfield, Stephanie. "Julien Farel, Cult Hairstylist." Departures.com. N.p., 01 Jan 2011. Web. 18 Apr 2013. >.
Grinell, SunHee. "Julien Farel Salon on Fifth Avenue: My Old, New Discovery!" VanityFair.com. N.p., 11 Jun 2012. Web. 18 Apr 2013.
"JF Express" JulienFarel.com. N.p.. Web. 18 Apr 2013. 
"Cabo San Lucas" JulienFarel.com. N.p.. Web. 18 Apr 2013.
"JF Gymnastique" JFGymnastique.com. N.p.. Web. 18 Apr 2013.
"Loews Regency Hotel Announces Premier Hair Stylist Julien Farel as Partner for Salon and Spa" WSJ.com. N.p., 26 Mar 2013. Web. 18 Apr 2013. 
Orr, Conor. "Celebrity hairstylist Julien Farel reigns over manes at U.S. Open" NJ.com. N.p., 07 Sep 2010. Web. 18 Apr 2013. 
Grinell, SunHee. "Julien Farel Launches Hair-care Line" VanityFair.com. N.p., 01 Sep 2011. Web. 18 Apr 2013. 
"JF Haircare" JulienFarel.com. N.p.. Web. 18 Apr 2013.

1968 births
French hairdressers
People from Haute-Loire
Living people